The U.S. Post Office and Courthouse in Bellingham, Washington, also known as the Federal Building, was built during 1912–13.  It was designed by James Knox Taylor in Renaissance architecture style.  It served historically as a courthouse, as a post office, and as a government office building.  It was listed on the National Register of Historic Places in 1979.

It is a 4-story  by  building.

References

Federal buildings in the United States
Courthouses on the National Register of Historic Places in Washington (state)
Renaissance Revival architecture in Washington (state)
Government buildings completed in 1912
Buildings and structures in Whatcom County, Washington
Courthouses in Washington (state)
Post office buildings on the National Register of Historic Places in Washington (state)
1912 establishments in Washington (state)
National Register of Historic Places in Whatcom County, Washington